Andrew Philip DeCaro (born September 1, 1983), better known by his stage name Dru Decaro, is an American musician, singer-songwriter and producer. He is best known as the lead guitarist for Grammy-winning RnB artist Miguel and has also performed with Snoop Dogg, Will.I.Am, John Legend, Ice Cube, Faith Hill, Lil Jon, Jojo, Andy Grammer, Vic Mensa, Machine Gun Kelly, Christian French, Elle Varner, Chrisette Michele, Monomaniac, Smashtronauts, Gianni & kyle.

Early life 
DeCaro was born to Jeffrey and Teresa DeCaro in Washington, D.C. and moved to Baltimore at the age of three. At age 10, DeCaro's uncle left an old guitar at their home while in the midst of moving. Curious, DeCaro convinced his uncle to let him keep the guitar, and he took to it immediately. Assembling kids from the neighborhood, DeCaro formed a band and immediately began writing songs and rehearsing in a friend's basement.

At 15, while working at a local pub, DeCaro met an older drummer and was thrust into Baltimore's rock and heavy metal scenes. The resulting band, called Ex-Rate, was heavily influenced by the metal bands of the early-2000s and east coast hip hop, played countless shows around the Mid-Atlantic, sharing the bill with The Strokes, Good Charlotte, and Pissing Razors, and recording an EP at Omega Studios. The band had to sneak DeCaro into the back doors of bars and clubs where they played. He was expelled from high school on arson and reckless endangerment charges and sought refuge in music and the band. The group split shortly after.

Still in contact with the bassist, Matt Long, Dru called on him again when forming his next band. "To A Science" was a four-piece, progressive rock band in the early-2000s. Still a teenager, Dru remained principal songwriter and de facto leader of the band as they performed around the region and recorded their only EP, Why Stop Now’

Career 
At the age of 20, Dru moved to Los Angeles, where he enrolled in Cal State University, Northridge and studied jazz guitar. He landed a job bartending at the world-famous Viper Room on the Sunset Strip and soon after began booking shows and performing weekly there. It was on the Viper Room's tiny stage that Dru first played with Erykah Badu at an impromptu jam session, and ultimately set him off on a course of RnB, soul and urban music. Soon, he met DJ Skee, and becoming Skee's house guitarist, began playing, recording and producing for Snoop Dogg, Game, Ice Cube and others. Soon Dru was leading a 10-piece band and hosting a weekly jam at nearby House of Blues, Sunset Strip, and did so for two years until he started touring heavily.

Notable instruments 
PRS 305 (Snow White)
Fender Stratocaster
PRS 513 Dru Decaro custom (Tigerlily)

References

American rhythm and blues singer-songwriters
American rhythm and blues guitarists
American male guitarists
California State University, Northridge alumni
Living people
Musicians from Baltimore
1983 births
Singer-songwriters from Maryland
Guitarists from Maryland
21st-century American male singers
21st-century American singers
21st-century American guitarists
American male singer-songwriters